Talmudic Academy may refer to:

a yeshiva
Talmudic Academies in Babylonia
Talmudic Academies in Syria Palaestina